Roberts-Quay House is a historic home located in the Washington Square West neighborhood of Philadelphia, Pennsylvania. The original section was built in about 1850, and expanded in 1889, 1906, 1921, and 1928.

Overview 
The original section measures 47 feet by 51 feet, and is a four-story building with a brownstone face and sides of stucco, scored as brownstone. It has a basement, attic, and cupola and is in a Renaissance Revival style. The additions to the north add an additional 100 feet to the depth of the building. It was a home of Matthew Quay (1833–1904), a United States Senator from Pennsylvania.

The house was added to the National Register of Historic Places in 1976.

See also

 Matthew S. Quay House

References

Houses on the National Register of Historic Places in Pennsylvania
Renaissance Revival architecture in Pennsylvania
Houses completed in 1928
Houses in Philadelphia
Washington Square West, Philadelphia
National Register of Historic Places in Philadelphia